Konrad Hermann Heinrich Christ (12 December 1833, in Basel – 23 November 1933, in Riehen), often known in citations as just "Christ" or "H. Christ", was a Swiss botanist who specialized in pteridology (ferns). 

He studied law at the universities of Basel and Berlin, receiving his doctorate at Basel in 1856. From 1869 to 1908 he worked as a lawyer and notary in Basel. In his spare time and during retirement he engaged in botanical pursuits, publishing over 300 works on topics such as plant geography, systematics and history of botany.

The fern genus Christella is named in his honour.

Publications
 Das Pflanzenleben der Schweiz, 1879
Christ, Hermann: "Die Botrychium-Arten des Austral Amerika." Arkiv for Botanik, Vol. 6, NO. 3. Stockholm, Sweden. 1906. German.
Christ, Hermann: Die Farnkräuter der Erde [The Ferns of the World], Beschreibende Darstellung der Geschlechter und wichtigeren Arten der Farnpflanzen mit besonderer Berücksichtigung der exotischen. Gustav Fischer, Jena. 1897. xii,388pp, 292 text-illustrations, 260mm. German.
Christ, Hermann: Die Farnkräuter der Schweiz [The Ferns of Switzerland]. Beiträge zur Kryptogamenflora der Schweiz, Vol. 1, Part 2. Bern, Switzerland. 1900. German.
Christ, Hermann: Die Geographie der Farne [Geography of the Ferns]. Jena. 1910. German.
Christ, Hermann: "Über die australen Polystichum-Arten." Arkiv for Botanik, Vol. 4, no. 12. Stockholm, Sweden. 1905. German.

References

Pteridologists
19th-century Swiss botanists
University of Basel alumni
1833 births
1933 deaths
20th-century Swiss botanists